Ctibor Jindřich Malý (7 December 1885 – 8 January 1968) was a Czech footballer who played as a forward.

Club career
A Prague native, Malý began his career with Slavia Prague in 1905, playing with the club over the course of five seasons, winning the Charity Cup	with Slavia in 1908. In 1910, Malý signed for Pardubice, playing for the club for a season.

International career
On 7 October 1906, Malý made his debut for Bohemia in a 4–4 draw against Hungary. Malý would go on to make two more appearances for Bohemia.

Ice hockey career
Whilst still playing for Slavia Prague, Malý represented Slavia's ice hockey team, playing as a centre. Malý represented Bohemia in their first game at the 1909 Coupe de Chamonix.

References

1885 births
1968 deaths
Footballers from Prague
Association football forwards
Czech footballers
Czechoslovak footballers
SK Slavia Prague players
Bohemia international footballers
HC Slavia Praha players
Czech ice hockey centres
Czechoslovak ice hockey centres
Ice hockey people from Prague
People from the Kingdom of Bohemia